The Nagpur–Goa Expressway, also known as the Shaktipeeth Expressway, is a proposed  long, six-lane, access-controlled expressway, which will connect the third largest city of Maharashtra, Nagpur with the state of Goa. It will pass through 11 districts of Maharashtra and one district of Goa. It will be built at a cost of ₹ 83,600 crore, which was earlier slated at ₹ 75,000 crore. It is named the Shaktipeeth Expressway, as it will pass through three Shakti Peethas. They are Mahalakshmi, Tuljabhavani, and Patradevi. It will be the longest expressway in Maharashtra.

History
To improve Maharashtra's connectivity, tourism, development and economic growth, the Government of Maharashtra planned to build a new expressway from Nagpur to Goa. The expressway is expected to cut travel time from 18 to 20 hours to 7–8 hours. The expressway will pass through the regions of Vidarbha, Marathwada and Western Maharashtra. Once completed, these regions will see exponential growth with the growth of industries and socio-economic development by promoting employment among people living in the regions, which the regions currently lack altogether. The plan was launched by the former Chief Minister of Maharashtra, and currently the Deputy Chief Minister of Maharashtra, Devendra Fadnavis, to the Cabinet of Maharashtra, in September 2022, and stated that it would be built at a cost of ₹ 75,000 crore. In March 2023, the project was approved by the Government of Maharashtra, and, though did not give any specific deadline for the completion of the expressway, but announced that it would be built at a cost of ₹ 83,600 crore, and will be opened to the traffic by 2028/29.

Route

Maharashtra
The expressway will start from Pavnar in Wardha district, from where it will be linked with the Mumbai–Nagpur Expressway to link Nagpur, due to Pavnar's close proximity to that expressway, and will cover the following districts along with their cities:

Wardha
Yavatmal
Hingoli
Nanded
Parbhani
Latur
Beed
Osmanabad
Solapur
Sangli
Kolhapur
Sindhudurg

Goa
The expressway will terminate at the following city and district:

Patradevi, North Goa district

Construction
The Government of Maharashtra has announced that the expressway will begin construction after the under-construction Mumbai–Nagpur Expressway is fully completed by June 2023. Tenders were launched for the project's construction in October 2022 by the Maharashtra State Road Development Corporation (MSRDC) after the announcement of the project in September 2022, and in January 2023, three bids have been received, out of which a consultant will be chosen to handle the project. The construction work will begin when the tenders and consultants will have been finalised. The project will be built using the Engineering, Procurement, and Construction (EPC) technology, which provides and ensures security, liability caps, and a performance guarantee for an infrastructure, and the work is expected to take five to seven years to complete. As of March 2023, the Government of Maharashtra has begun the preparation for the technical and feasibility study of the project.

The three bidders who have bidded for the project, after which a consultant will be selected for preparing the feasibility study and the Detailed Project Report (DPR), are as follows:

L. N. Malviya Infra Projects Pvt. Ltd.
Monarch Surveyors & Engineering Consultants Pvt. Ltd.
TPF Engineering Pvt. Ltd.

Benefits
The expressway will greatly benefit the regions of Vidarbha, Marathwada, Konkan region and North Goa by many ways to facilitate socio-economic development, as described in the following:

Trade: The expressway will benefit not only the regions through which it will pass, but also to Central India, by a creating a direct link, as it will help to boost exports as well as imports from the mineral ores and industrial products, as it is abundant in the states of western Madhya Pradesh and Chhattisgarh as a whole, via the Mormugao Port in Goa to and from West Asia, Europe and Africa. It will help to promote industrial activities in central Maharashtra, and will also be benefitted like the same. 
Tourism: The expressway will help to promote tourism, especially in the Western Ghats and northern Goa, and promote pilgrimage tourism in Vidarbha and Marathwada, due to the presence of a high level of religious sites in the two regions.
Connectivity: Once operational, the expressway will become a direct route from Central India to Goa, by allowing faster, better and safer commute by avoiding congested routes, such as via Mumbai and Pune at present. It will reduce both travel time and distance considerably, from 18 to 20 hours at present to only 7–8 hours, and from approx. 1,110 km to only 760 km.
Protection of the Environment: The Government of Maharashtra has agreed to build the expressway as a 'Green Corridor' project. In view of this, thousands of plants, including trees and shrubs, are planted along and between the expressway.
Employment: Due to increase in industrial activities along the expressway's route, various agricultural and industrial initiatives to help the state's economy and growth. The establishment of these numerous centres will result in multiple job possibilities for thousands of people living in both the states.

Project timeline
September 2022: The former Chief Minister of Maharashtra, and now the Deputy Chief Minister of Maharashtra, Devendra Fadnavis, announced the plan of the expressway to the Government of Maharashtra.
October 2022: Tenders launched for the project by the Maharashtra State Road Development Corporation (MSRDC).
January 2023: Three bids received for the project by MSRDC.
March 2023: The project was approved by the Government of Maharashtra in the FY2023-24 State Budget.
March 2023: The Government of Maharashtra began the preparation for the technical and feasibility report of the project.

See also
List of expressways in Maharashtra
Expressways in India

References

Highways in India
Roads in India